Children is the second studio album by the British rock-band The Mission. It was released in 20 February 1988 by Mercury Records. Two singles were released from the album, "Tower of Strength" and "Beyond the Pale". A third single, "Kingdom Come", was scheduled but appeared only as a promo.
 
Singer Julianne Regan (from the band All About Eve) sang vocals on two tracks - "Beyond the Pale" and "Black Mountain Mist".

Children was re-issued in 2007 with four bonus tracks.

Track listing

Except where noted: all music by Adams, Brown, Hinkler and Hussey; and words by Hussey

1988 release 
 "Beyond the Pale" – 7:49
 "Wing and a Prayer" – 3:41
 "Fabienne" – 3:41
 "Heaven on Earth" – 5:19
 "Tower of Strength" – 8:03
 "Kingdom Come" – 4:50
 "Breathe" – 1:26
 "Child's Play" – 3:39
 "Shamera Kye" (J. S. Webb) – 0:34
 "Black Mountain Mist" – 2:54
 "Dream On" (Steven Tyler) – 3:54
 "Heat" – 5:14
 "Hymn (for America)" – 6:35

1988 vinyl release 
Side A
 "Beyond the Pale" – 7:49
 "Wing and a Prayer" – 3:41
 "Heaven on Earth" – 5:19
 "Tower of Strength" – 8:03
Side B
 "Kingdom Come" – 4:50
 "Breathe" – 1:26
 "Child's Play" – 3:39
 "Shamera Kye" (J. S. Webb) – 0:34
 "Black Mountain Mist" – 2:54
 "Heat" – 5:14
 "Hymn (for America)" – 6:35

"Fabienne" and "Dream On" appeared only on the CD and MC releases.

2007 re-issue 
 "Beyond the Pale" – 7:49
 "Wing and a Prayer" – 3:41
 "Fabienne" – 3:41
 "Heaven on Earth" – 5:19
 "Tower of Strength" – 8:03
 "Kingdom Come" – 4:50
 "Breathe" – 1:26
 "Child's Play" – 3:39
 "Shamera Kye" (J. S. Webb) – 0:34
 "Black Mountain Mist" – 2:54
 "Dream On" (Steven Tyler)– 3:54
 "Heat" – 5:14
 "Hymn (for America)" – 6:35
 Bonus tracks
  "Tadeusz (1912-1988)" - 4:57
 "Child's Play (Live)" - 3:46
 "Kingdom Come (Heavenly Mix)" - 8:09
 "Heat (Tim Palmer Version)" - 4:06

Produced by John Paul Jones
Engineered by Mark 'Spike' Stent

Personnel 
The Mission
 Wayne Hussey – guitars, vocals
 Simon Hinkler – guitars, keyboards
 Craig Adams – bass
 Mick Brown – drums
Additional musicians
 John Paul Jones – keyboards, programming 
 Julianne Regan – additional voice on "Beyond the Pale" and "Black Mountain Mist"
 Jez Webb – harmonica on "Shamera Kye"
 Michael Ade – violin on "Shamera Kye"
 Skaila Kenga – Celtic harp on "Black Mountain Mist"
 Woodstock Infant School – additional voices on "Heat" and "Hymn (for America)"

References

1988 albums
The Mission (band) albums
Mercury Records albums